Al-Mu'allim (The teacher) was first studio debut album by british singer- songwriter Sami Yusuf released on 10-july-2003 
This album sold over 34 million copies in world wide.

Track list

Music videos
"Al-Mu'allim"
"Supplication"

References

2003 debut albums
Arabic-language albums
Sami Yusuf albums
Awakening Music albums